Ruwan Senani Kalpage (born 19 February 1970) is a former Sri Lankan cricketer. He was a left-handed batsman and a right-arm offbreak bowler.

He studied at St. Anthony's College, Kandy and played for the College Cricket team in 1989.

Coaching career
He was appointed as the high performance head coach for Bangladesh's National Cricket Academy in 2008.  He is the assistant coach for Oman since 2022. He has not played international cricket since March 1999.

References

1970 births
Living people
Sri Lanka One Day International cricketers
Sri Lanka Test cricketers
Sri Lankan cricketers
Nondescripts Cricket Club cricketers
Cricketers from Kandy
Kandurata cricketers
Alumni of St. Anthony's College, Kandy
Cricketers at the 1992 Cricket World Cup
Cricketers at the 1999 Cricket World Cup
Sri Lankan cricket coaches